Krasnogvardeysky is a rural locality (a settlement) in Cherepanovsky Selsoviet, Zmeinogorsky District, Altai Krai, Russia. The population was 1 as of 2013. There is 1 street.

Geography 
Krasnogvardeysky is located 6 km north of Zmeinogorsk (the district's administrative centre) by road. Zmeinogorsk is the nearest rural locality.

References 

Rural localities in Zmeinogorsky District